Hammer Bowling is a company involved in the manufacture and sale of bowling balls and bowling-related accessories.

Faball Enterprises was formed in 1978 by Johnny Wonders and Earl Widman. In 1981, they created the second urethane ball in the market, and Hammer was born. Hammer was the first to put a logo on the side of the ball. After a PBA player was featured in a tournament telecast using the ball with its visible claw hammer logo, sales exploded. The Hammer brand was also the first to produce a urethane two-piece ball.  In 1996, Faball Enterprises licensed the Hammer product name to Faball USA. This company maintained the brand name until Hammer products were acquired by Ebonite International on February 8, 2002. 

After the sale of its Hammer line to Ebonite, the Faball team went on to create a new line of equipment under the name of Visionary Bowling Products. They currently produce several lines of equipment including the popular Ogre series, the New Breed series and Gladiator series. Visionary Bowling Products are manufactured in St. Louis, MO. 

Some of the more famous Faball era Hammer products are the Blue Hammer, Red Hammer, Burgundy Hammer, Black Hammer, The Nail and the Reaper series. Some of the more famous post-Faball era Hammer lines include the Blade series, Vicious series, Diesel series, Hawg series, No Mercy Series, Vibe series, Black Widow Series, Jigsaw series, the Raw Hammer, Hammer Hardcore and Taboo series. Hammer sponsors several PBA Tour, including PBA champions Bill O'Neill, Tom Daugherty, Shawn Maldonado and Mike Wolfe, as well as PWBA champions and Team USA members Shannon O'Keefe and Shannon Pluhowsky.

Hammer products were manufactured in Ebonite's Hopkinsville, Kentucky plant from 2002 through November, 2019. On November 15, 2019, Ebonite International and all of its brands were subsequently purchased by Brunswick Bowling Products, LLC.

References

External links
Company homepage

Ten-pin bowling equipment manufacturers